Flaming Gorge is a census-designated place in Daggett County, Utah, United States. The population was 83 at the 2010 census.

Demographics
As of the census of 2010, there were 83 people living in the CDP. There were 109 housing units. The racial makeup of the CDP was 97.6% White, 1.2% from some other race, and 1.2% from two or more races. Hispanic or Latino of any race were 4.8% of the population.

Geography
The CDP is located in the Flaming Gorge National Recreation Area, south of Flaming Gorge Reservoir and north of Greendale Junction.

Climate

According to the Köppen Climate Classification system, Flaming Gorge has a warm-summer humid continental climate, abbreviated "Dfb" on climate maps.

See also

 List of census-designated places in Utah

References

External links

Census-designated places in Utah
Census-designated places in Daggett County, Utah